Olivier Wieviorka (born 1960), is a French historian specializing in the history of World War II and the French Resistance.  He is a faculty member at the École normale supérieure de Cachan.

He is the brother of historian Annette Wieviorka and sociologist Michel Wieviorka.

His paternal grandparents, Polish Jews, were arrested in Nice during World War II and murdered at Auschwitz.  His father, a refugee in Switzerland, and his mother, daughter of a Parisian tailor and a refugee in Grenoble, survived the war.

Works 
Normandy: The Landings to the Liberation of Paris (Harvard University Press, 2018)

References

1960 births
Living people
20th-century French historians
French people of Polish-Jewish descent
Historians of World War II
Historians of Vichy France
21st-century French historians